My Back Pages: Reviews and Essays by Steven Moore (Zerogram Press, 2017) is a collection of book reviews that were originally published in periodicals from the late 1970s onward.

The book is named after "My Back Pages", a song by Bob Dylan.

Moore is considered the leading authority on William Gaddis. He also writes about helping David Foster Wallace edit Infinite Jest.

Topics covered by this book are literary criticism, postmodernism, the Beat Generation, maximalism, gay literature, punctuation, nympholepsy, and the history of the novel.

Release details
 2017, Zerogram Press, Hardback
 2018, Zerogram Press, Paperback (corrected, expanded edition)

References

External links
 Michael Silverblatt interviews Steven Moore on Bookworm, 89.9 FM, KCRW

American non-fiction literature
Books of literary criticism
Postmodern literature
2017 non-fiction books